Rafael Rincón González (Maracaibo, Zulia state, Venezuela, September 30, 1922 – January 15, 2012) was a Venezuelan musician. He is a composer of more than 600 songs, including “Pregones Zulianos," which was recorded by the Royal Philharmonic Orchestra. He was named to the orders of San Sebastián and Diego de Losada (1997). On August 23, 1993, his compositions were determined to be the musical patrimony of the Zulia state.

See also 
Venezuela
Venezuelan music

References 
  

1922 births
2012 deaths
People from Maracaibo
Venezuelan composers
Male composers
Venezuelan folk singers
20th-century Venezuelan  male singers